Susan Hurley (born 1946) is an American composer living and working in Los Angeles, California.

Hurley's compositional style is an "unusual, unique voice [and] highly individualistic." Her work "defines [the] two opposing characteristics of the post-minimalist style – lyricism and rhythmic drive . . .”
The 1992 piece "Gallery Music for Harp" examples this by engaging the listener with "a strong introductory flourish" developing into "gentle, otherworldly sounds.” This alternation between opposites is observed again in a review of "Vermont Poems" and its harmonic reliance on "shifts between unisons and dissonants" 

The range of the instruments used by Hurley is broad, including ancient and subtle instruments such as the clavichord and older compositional vehicles such as the chamber opera.  Hurley wrote one such opera based on the lives of Anaïs Nin and Rupert Pole.  This was commissioned by Joan Palevsky of Los Angeles.  Palevsky had been "instrumental" in securing a transfer of the papers of Anaïs Nin to UCLA. The commission was part of this effort.

Hurley was born in Massachusetts and raised in Vermont.

Education
American Conservatory, Fontainebleau, France, studied under Nadia Boulanger, and others.
Eastman School of Music, MM, composition, 1982
Indiana University’s School of Music, DM, composition, 1988

Work

Professional positions and residencies
Composer-in-residence, seven years Interlochen Center for the Arts, Interlochen, Michigan
Composer-in-residence, Atlantic Center for the Arts, Lawrence University
Visiting faculty, “Associate Instructor,” teaching fellowship, Indiana University
Composer-in-residence, New York, Meet the Composer

Commissions
Sage City Symphony, Bennington, VT SCS reference
The New Calliope Singers, New York, NY, details pending
"Anaïs," a one-act chamber opera for soprano & tenor about the life of Anaïs Nin.
There are various film scores. The details of these are best obtained through ASCAP.

Discography, partial
"Soft Sounds," CD, Omstream, Zehn Improvisitationen, Clavichord, [vor 2004] Aufnahme 2004, P 2005, Deutsche Clavichord Societät, German Clavichord Society reference,Omstream publishers note
"Wind River Songs," Capstone Records, Nicole Philibosian, soprano, Crispin Campbell, cello, Michael Coonrod, piano publishers note,Society of Composers Listing, Wind River Songs
"Vermont Poems," Finnadar Records, New Calliope Singers, directed Peter Schubert “10th Anniversary Anthology of New Choral Chamber Music” Finnadar Catalog 908501, publishers note
"The Audio Book of Alice's Adventures in Wonderland," KCRW Studios

Publications
"Grassroots Commissioning," Symphony Magazine, April/May 1984, p. 8
"Vermont Poems," choral work published by Ludwig Music, Inc. (ASCAP)
"Visions," choral work published by Ludwig Music, Inc. (ASCAP)

Audio samples
Sample of The Audio Book of Alices Adventures in Wonderland, with original music by Hurley, KCRW Studios

Work in progress includes
At the time of this writing, April 2008, Hurley is working on an opera of larger scale entitled The Sibyl of Cumae.

Notes

Biographical references
"International Encyclopedia of Women Composers," Publisher: Books & Music USA; 2nd edition (June 1987) 
Composers Forum Biography
Artist Biography Omstream Publishing

1946 births
20th-century classical composers
21st-century classical composers
American women composers
Living people
21st-century American composers
Women classical composers
20th-century American women musicians
20th-century American composers
21st-century American women musicians
20th-century women composers
21st-century women composers